Velennes may refer to the following places in France:

 Velennes, Oise, a commune in the Oise department
 Velennes, Somme, a commune in the Somme department